Gooseberry ( or  (American and northern British) or  (southern British)) is a common name for many species of Ribes (which also includes currants), as well as a large number of plants of similar appearance. The berries of those in the genus Ribes (sometimes placed in the genus Grossularia) are edible and may be green, orange, red, purple, yellow, white, or black.

Etymology 
The goose in gooseberry has been mistakenly seen as a corruption of either the Dutch word  or the allied German , or of the earlier forms of the French . However, the Oxford English Dictionary takes the more literal derivation from goose and berry as probable because "the grounds on which plants and fruits have received names associating them with animals are so often inexplicable that the inappropriateness in the meaning does not necessarily give good grounds for believing that the word is an etymological corruption". In Britain, gooseberries may informally be called goosegogs.

Gooseberry bush was 19th-century slang for pubic hair, and from this comes the saying that babies are "born under a gooseberry bush".

In history
Gooseberry growing was popular in 19th-century Britain. The 1879 edition of the Encyclopedia Britannica described gooseberries thus: 
 The gooseberry is indigenous to many parts of Europe and western Asia, growing naturally in alpine thickets and rocky woods in the lower country, from France eastward, well into the Himalayas and peninsular India.
In Britain, it is often found in copses and hedgerows and about old ruins, but the gooseberry has been cultivated for so long that it is difficult to distinguish wild bushes from feral ones, or to determine where the gooseberry fits into the native flora of the island. Common as it is now on some of the lower slopes of the Alps of Piedmont and Savoy, it is uncertain whether the Romans were acquainted with the gooseberry, though it may possibly be alluded to in a vague passage of Pliny the Elder's Natural History; the hot summers of Italy, in ancient times as at present, would be unfavourable to its cultivation. Although gooseberries are now abundant in Germany and France, it does not appear to have been much grown there in the Middle Ages, though the wild fruit was held in some esteem medicinally for the cooling properties of its acid juice in fevers; while the old English name, Fea-berry, still surviving in some provincial dialects, indicates that it was similarly valued in Britain, where it was planted in gardens at a comparatively early period.

William Turner describes the gooseberry in his Herball, written about the middle of the 16th century, and a few years later it is mentioned in one of Thomas Tusser's quaint rhymes as an ordinary object of garden culture. Improved varieties were probably first raised by the skilful gardeners of Holland, whose name for the fruit, Kruisbezie, may have been corrupted into the present English vernacular word. Towards the end of the 18th century the gooseberry became a favourite object of cottage-horticulture, especially in Lancashire, where the working cotton-spinners raised numerous varieties from seed, their efforts having been chiefly directed to increasing the size of the fruit.

Of the many hundred sorts enumerated in recent horticultural works, few perhaps equal in flavour some of the older denizens of the fruit-garden, such as the Old Rough Red and Hairy Amber. The climate of the British Isles seems peculiarly adapted to bring the gooseberry to perfection, and it may be grown successfully even in the most northern parts of Scotland; indeed, the flavour of the fruit is said to improve with increasing latitude. In Norway even, the bush flourishes in gardens on the west coast nearly up to the Arctic Circle, and it is found wild as far north as 63°. The dry summers of the French and German plains are less suited to it, though it is grown in some hilly districts with tolerable success. The gooseberry in the south of England will grow well in cool situations and may sometimes be seen in gardens near London flourishing under the partial shade of apple trees, but in the north it needs full exposure to the sun to bring the fruit to perfection. It will succeed in almost any soil but prefers a rich loam or black alluvium, and, though naturally a plant of rather dry places, will do well in moist land, if drained.

The gooseberry was more populous in North America before it was discovered that it carries blister rust, deadly to certain pines, resulting in its removal from forest areas.

Ecology
Black bears, various birds and small mammals eat the berries, while game animals, coyotes, foxes and raccoons browse the foliage.

Modern cultivation
Humans cultivate gooseberries as insect habitats or directly for the sweet fruits. Numerous cultivars have been developed for both commercial and domestic use. Of special note are Ribes 'Careless', 'Greenfinch', 'Invicta', 'Leveller', and 'Whinham's Industry', to which the Royal Horticultural Society has awarded Garden Merit.

Ribes gooseberries are commonly raised from cuttings rather than seed; cuttings planted in the autumn will take root quickly and begin to bear fruit within a few years. Nevertheless, bushes planted from seed also rapidly reach maturity, exhibit similar pest-tolerance, and yield heavily. Fruit is produced on lateral spurs and the previous year's shoots.

Gooseberries must be pruned to insolate  the interior and make space for the next year's branches, as well as reduce scratching from the spines when picking. Overladen branches can be (and often are) cut off complete with berries without substantially harming the plant. Heavy nitrogen composting produces excessive growth, weakening the bush to mildew.

Fungal pests
Gooseberries, like other members of genus Ribes are banned or restricted in several states of the United States of America because they are secondary (telial) hosts for white pine blister rust.

Insect habitat
Gooseberry bushes (Ribes) are hosts to magpie moth (Abraxas grossulariata) caterpillars. Gooseberry plants are also a preferred host plant for comma butterfly (Polygonia c-album), whose larvae frequently feed upon the plant during the development stage, v-moth (Macaria wauaria), and gooseberry sawfly (Nematus ribesii). Nematus ribesii grubs will bury themselves in the ground to pupate; on hatching into adult form, they lay their eggs, which hatch into larvae on the underside of gooseberry leaves.

Culinary uses
Gooseberries are edible and can be eaten raw, or cooked as an ingredient in desserts, such as pies, fools and crumbles. Early pickings are generally sour and more appropriate for culinary use. This includes most supermarket gooseberries, which are often picked before fully ripe to increase shelf life. Gooseberries are also used to flavour beverages such as sodas, flavoured waters, or milk, and can be made into fruit wines and teas. Gooseberries can be preserved in the form of jams, dried fruit, as the primary or a secondary ingredient in pickling, or stored in sugar syrup.

Nutritionally, gooseberries are a rich source of vitamin C, with no other micronutrients in significant content (see table).

European gooseberry are often used for varenye fruit preserves in European Russia.

See also

 List of gooseberries

References

Berries